Sarang'ombe is a part of Kibera  in Nairobi.Some parts of Sarang'ombe ward include Ayany Estate. It is part of Kibra Constituency. An Ushirika Health Centre is in Sarang'ombe. Other parts of Kibera include Laini Saba, Lindi, Makina, Kianda, Gatwekera, Soweto East, Kichinjio, Kisumu Ndogo, Makongeni and Mashimoni.

See also 
Raila
Shilanga 
Siranga

References

Suburbs of Nairobi
Slums in Kenya